The Sale of Goods Act 1893 (56 & 57 Vict. c.71) was an Act of the Parliament of the United Kingdom of Great Britain and Ireland which regulated contracts in which goods are sold and bought. Its purpose was to define the rights and duties of the parties (where not expressly defined in the agreement), while specifically preserving the relevance of ordinary contractual principles. The Act remains in force in the Republic of Ireland.

Background
The Act was drafted by Sir Mackenzie Chalmers, who later drafted the Marine Insurance Act 1906. As noted by Lord Denning MR in The Mihalis Angelos [1971] 1 QB 164 he adopted a division between conditions and warranties in terms of contracts, propounded by Sir Frederick Pollock in his book Formation of Contracts. This was followed by Fletcher Moulton LJ in a celebrated dissent in Wallis, Son & Wells v Pratt & Haynes [1910] 2 KB 1003, 1012 and adopted by the House of Lords in [1911] AC 394.

The Sale of Goods Act 1893 is considered to be classic example of a codifying statute; that is, it draws on established judge-made common law principles and converts them into a more accessible statutory form.  This Act of Parliament was so well-drafted that, when it was repealed and reenacted, the successor Sale of Goods Act 1979 was instantly familiar, sharing the same structure, phraseology and even numbering as the 1893 Act.

Repeal
The whole of this Act, except for section 26, was repealed on 1 January 1980, subject to a number of savings. Section 26 was repealed on 1 January 1982.

The 1893 Act is still operative in Ireland, although it has been amended on a number of occasions since it came into force.

See also
Sale of Goods Act
Bentsen v Taylor, Sons & Co [1893] 2 QB 274, 280, per Bowen LJ adopting the SGA 1893 scheme of conditions and warranties.

Notes

External links
 The Sale of Goods Act 1893, as originally enacted, from the Office of Public Sector Information.

United Kingdom Acts of Parliament 1893
Consumer protection legislation
English contract law
Consumer protection in the United Kingdom